Qaemiyeh-ye Olya (also Romanized as Qā’emīyeh-ye ‘Olyā; also known as Qā’emīyeh) is a village in Dabuy-ye Jonubi Rural District, Dabudasht District, Amol County, Mazandaran Province, Iran. At the 2006 census, its population was 439, in 112 families.

References 

Populated places in Amol County